The 2016–17 Tennessee Volunteers basketball team represented the University of Tennessee in the 2016–17 NCAA Division I men's basketball season. The Volunteers were led by second-year head coach Rick Barnes. The team played its home games at Thompson–Boling Arena in Knoxville, Tennessee, as a member of the Southeastern Conference. They finished the season 16–16, 8–10 in SEC play to finish in a tie for ninth place. They lost in the second round of the SEC tournament to Georgia.

Previous season
The Vols posted a record of 15–19, 6–12 in SEC play, during the 2015–16 season and finished in 12th place. They advanced to the quarterfinals of the SEC tournament where they lost to LSU.

Roster turnover

Departures

Incoming transfers

Recruiting

2016

Source:

2017 

Source:

Roster

Depth chart

Source:

Schedule
Tennessee opened the season against the Chattanooga Mocs.  Additionally they played these games: at East Tennessee State, host Georgia Tech, and at North Carolina. The Vols took part in the 2016 Maui Invitational tournament, where they finished 7th.  Tennessee hosted Kansas State in the Big 12/SEC Challenge.  Tennessee released its full non-conference schedule on June 24.  The 2016 Maui Invitational Tournament bracket was announced on July 19.
 
|-
!colspan=12 style=| Exhibition

|-
!colspan=12 style=| Regular season

|-
!colspan=12 style=| SEC Tournament

Source:

References

Tennessee
Tennessee Volunteers basketball seasons
Volunteers
Volunteers